Zběšičky is a municipality and village in Písek District in the South Bohemian Region of the Czech Republic. It has about 200 inhabitants.

Administrative parts
The village of Popovec and the hamlet of Hanov are administrative parts of Zběšičky.

References

Villages in Písek District